Plastic optical fiber (POF) or polymer optical fiber is an optical fiber that is made out of polymer. Similar to glass optical fiber, POF transmits light (for illumination or data) through the core of the fiber. Its chief advantage over the glass product, other aspect being equal, is its robustness under bending and stretching.

History 
Since 2014 a full family of PHY transceivers have been available in the market enabling the design and manufacturing of home networking equipment delivering Gigabit speeds into the home.

One of the most exciting developments in polymer fibers has been the development of microstructured polymer optical fibers (mPOF), a type of photonic crystal fiber.

Materials 
Traditionally, PMMA (acrylic) comprises the core (96% of the cross section in a fiber 1mm in diameter), and fluorinated polymers are the cladding material. Since the late 1990s much higher performance graded-index (GI-POF) fiber based on amorphous fluoropolymer (poly(perfluoro-butenylvinyl ether), CYTOP) has begun to appear in the marketplace.
Polymer optical fibers are typically manufactured using extrusion, in contrast to the method of pulling used for glass fibers.

Characteristics of PMMA POF 
 PMMA and polystyrene are used as the core, with refractive indices of 1.49 and 1.59 respectively.
 Generally, fiber cladding is made of silicone resin (refractive index ~1.46).
 High refractive index difference is maintained  between core and cladding.
 High numerical aperture.
 Have high mechanical flexibility and low cost.
 Industry-standard (IEC 60793-2-40 A4a.2) step-index fiber has a core diameter of 1mm.
 Attenuation loss is about  @ 
 Bandwidth is  @

Applications

Data networks 
POF has been called the "consumer" optical fiber because the fiber and associated optical links, connectors, and installation are all inexpensive. Due to the attenuation and distortion characteristics of PMMA fibers, they are commonly used for low-speed, short-distance (up to 100 meters) applications in digital home appliances, home networks, industrial networks (PROFIBUS, PROFINET, Sercos, EtherCAT), and car networks (MOST). The perfluorinated polymer fibers are commonly used for much higher-speed applications such as data center wiring and building LAN wiring.

In relation to the future requirements of high-speed home networking, there has been an increasing interest in POF as a possible option for next-generation Gigabit/s links inside the home. To this end, several European Research projects are active, such as POF-ALL  and POF-PLUS .

Sensors 
Polymer optical fibers can be used for remote sensing and multiplexing due to their low cost and high resistance.

It is possible to write fiber Bragg gratings in single and multimode POF. There are advantages in doing this over using silica fiber since the POF can be stretched further without breaking, some applications are described in the PHOSFOS project page.

Standards 
Optical fiber used in telecommunications is governed by European Standards EN 60793-2-40-2011.

Several standardization bodies at country, European, and worldwide levels are currently developing Gigabit communication standards for POF aimed towards home networking applications. It is expected the release at the beginning of 2012. 

An IEEE study group and later task force has been meeting since then until the publication on 2017 of the IEEE802.3bv Amendment. IEEE 802.3bv defines a 1 Gigabit/s full duplex transmission over SI-POF using red LED. It is called 1000BASE-RH.

This Gigabit POF IEEE standard is based on multilevel PAM modulation a frame structure, Tomlinson-Harashima Precoding and Multilevel coset coding modulation. The combination of all these techniques has proven to be an efficient way of achieving low-cost implementations at the same time that the transmission theoretical maximum capacity of the POF is approached.

Other alternatives are schemes like DMT, PAM-2 NRZ, DFE equalization or PAM-4. VDE standard was published in 2013. After the publication the IEEE asked VDE to withdraw the specification and bring all the effort to IEEE. VDE withdrew the specification and a CFI was presented to IEEE in March 2014.

References

Literature 
C.M.Okonkwo, E. Tangdiongga, H. Yang, D. Visani, S. Loquai, R. Kruglov, B. Charbonnier, M. Ouzzif, I. Greiss, O. Ziemann, R. Gaudino, A. M. J. Koonen, "Recent Results From the EU POF-PLUS Project: Multi-Gigabit Transmission Over 1 mm Core Diameter Plastic Optical Fibers", Journal of Lightwave Technology, Vol. 29., No.2., pp186–193 January 2011.
Ziemann, O., Krauser, J., Zamzow, P.E., Daum, W.: POF Handbook - Optical Short Range Transmission Systems. 2nd ed., 2008, Springer, 884 p. 491 illus. in color, 
 I. Möllers, D. Jäger, R. Gaudino, A. Nocivelli, H. Kragl, O. Ziemann, N. Weber, T. Koonen, C. Lezzi, A. Bluschke, S. Randel, “Plastic Optical Fiber Technology for Reliable Home Networking – Overview and Results of the EU Project POF-ALL,” IEEE Communications Magazine, Optical Communications Series, Vol.47, No.8, pp. 58–68, August 2009
R. Pérez de Aranda, O. Ciordia, C. Pardo, “A standard for Gigabit Ethernet over POF. Product Implementation”, Proc. of POF Conference 2011. Bilbao
S. Randel, C. Bunge, “Spectrally Efficient Polymer Optical Fiber Transmission”, Coherent Optical Communications, Subsystems and Systems, Proc. SPIE Vol. 7960
J. Lee, "Discrete Multitone Modulation for Short-Range Optical Communications," PhD Thesis, University of Technology Eindhoven, 2009. Link.

External links 
 VDE gigabit POF standard
 IEEE GEPOF Study group
 IEEE GEPOF Task force

Optical fiber
Plastics